Jack Short was the betrayer of Scottish legend Sir William Wallace. He was Wallace's servant, and relayed information to the Scottish baron John de Menteith, resulting in Wallace's capture and execution. According to the chronicler Piers Langtoft, Wallace had slain Jack's brother.

References 

Year of birth missing
Year of death missing
People of the Wars of Scottish Independence